Ashkadarovo (Aşqaźar) is a rural locality (a village) in Sabyrovsky Selsoviet, Zilairsky District, Bashkortostan, Russia. The population was 169 as of 2010. There are 3 streets.

Geography 
Ashkadarovo is located 48 km southeast of Zilair (the district's administrative centre) by road. Kadyrsha is the nearest rural locality.

References 

Rural localities in Zilairsky District